The 1933 Tipperary Senior Hurling Championship was the 42nd staging of the Tipperary Senior Hurling Championship since its establishment by the Tipperary County Board in 1887.

Moycarkey-Borris won the championship after a 1–07 to 1–00 win over Borrisokane in the final. It was the club's third title as Moycarkey-Borris but the seventh title to be claimed by a team representing the area.

References

Tipperary
Tipperary Senior Hurling Championship